KhTZ Stadium is a multi-purpose stadium and a city company located within Industrialnyi District, Kharkiv, commonly known as KhTZ. Near the closest Kharkiv Metro stations Imeni O.S. Maselskoho, it serves as a home soil to rugby clubs RC Olуmp and RC TEX-A-C and is sometimes used for athletics tournaments of domestic importance. The stadium also is a home to the Olympia sports school of the Olympic reserve.

History
The stadium was built in Soviet times as a primary fitness centre for workers of the Kharkiv Tractor Plant. The stadium is a home to FC Torpedo Kharkiv and women's team WFC Zhytlobud-1 Kharkiv

KhTZ Stadium has seven tennis courts, a light athletics hall, a boxing ring and a cycling track. Across from the stadium there is located the Hart swimming center, formerly Trudovi Rezervy.

See also
 Metalist Stadium

External links
 Brief info about stadium.
 Mykhailo Dobkin: "KhTZ won't be fixed just yet". "Status quo". Kharkiv 2012.
 Stolbetsov, O. KhTZ Stadium is working again. "Vyechyerniy Kharkov". November 19, 2008.
 Hokova, Ye. KhTZ Stadium celebrates its 75th Anniversary. Media Group "Objective". November 14, 2008.

Football venues in Kharkiv Oblast
Rugby union stadiums in Ukraine
Sports venues built in the Soviet Union
Sport in Kharkiv
Buildings and structures in Kharkiv
Multi-purpose stadiums in Ukraine
Sports venues completed in 1933
Sports venues in Kharkiv Oblast
1933 establishments in Ukraine